VDC may refer to:

Military
 Volunteer Defence Corps (Australia)
 Volunteer Defense Corps (Thailand)

Technology
 Vehicle Dynamics Control, a means of increasing vehicle stability through a combination of throttle restriction and braking.
 Voltage Direct Current, a contraction often found in electronics when specifying voltage in a mixed AC/DC environment. 
 Video display controller, a computer graphics chip.
 Virtual design and construction, modeling software and techniques to design and evaluate possible construction processes.
 Virtual data center, a data center that operates using virtualization technology.
 Virtual DataCine, a digital image processing technique for converting motion picture film to video.

Other uses
 Valletta Design Cluster, a culture and creativity centre in Malta
 Valve Developer Community, the official wiki for developers of games and mods based on the computer game Half-Life 2.
 Velocity : Design : Comfort, the 2nd studio album by Sweet Trip.
 Vietnam Day Committee, an anti-war group formed at Berkeley, California in 1965 by activist Jerry Rubin.
 Violations Documentation Center in Syria, a Syrian organisation documenting deaths, detentions, missing persons and kidnappings due to the Syrian civil war.
 Vitória da Conquista Airport (IATA airport code VDC), Vitória da Conquista, Brazil.
 Virtual Digital Cable, a media and technology company delivering television to desktop computers and mobile devices.
 Visma Document Center.

See also
 Village development committee (disambiguation)